Social classes in Iran have been divided up into upper class, propertied middle class, salaried middle class, working class, independent farmers, and rural wage earners. A more recent source divides Iranian classes into upper, middle class (about 32% of the population in 2000), working class (about 45% of the labor force), and lower class. Former Iranian President Mahmoud Ahmadinejad says 60 percent of his country's wealth is controlled by just 300 people in Iran. The gini coefficient was 0.38 in 2010 and the Human Development Index at 0.749 in 2013.

One of the main objectives of the Iranian Revolution was to have no social classes. In the post-revolutionary era, access to political power, an important basis for measuring influence and elite status in pre-revolutionary Iran, has continued to be important for ascribing status, even though the composition of the political elite has changed. For a decade after 1979, gaining entry to the political elite at the national or provincial level depended on having revolutionary credentials. These credentials depended on being able to provide evidence of having participated in the demonstrations and other revolutionary activities during 1978–79, and having a reputation for being a good Muslim. The necessary Muslim reputation was acquired by attending public prayers and observing Islamic codes of conduct in one's private life. Revolutionary credentials became less significant for the generation that matured after the early 1990s. Education, especially a college degree, became an informal substitute for revolutionary credentials.

Upper class

The top ten percent earners in Iranian society pay 3% of all income taxes, while in the United States the top 10% pay more than 70% of the total income taxes (US billionaires are collectively richer than their Iranian counterparts, however).
The postrevolutionary upper class consisted of some of the same social groups as the old elite, such as large landowners, industrialists, financiers, and large-scale merchants. Most of these groups have migrated out of Iran and their assets have been confiscated by the state. A minority of the pre-revolutionary upper class continue to work and live within Iran. For the most part, however, such persons did not occupy positions of political influence. Those with political influence comprised senior clergy, high-ranking bureaucrats, executive officers of public and private corporations and charitable foundations, and wealthy entrepreneurs; none had been part of the pre-revolutionary economic and social elite. Although a reputation for piety and loyalty to the ideals of the Revolution initially was a more important attribute than family or wealth for participation in the post-revolutionary political elite, those who attained politically powerful positions received generous salaries that elevated them to the top income brackets and opened access to multiple legitimate opportunities for acquiring more wealth. The children of the new elite generally have been encouraged to get college educations, and postgraduate degrees from foreign universities have become status symbols since the mid-1990s. These social trends have gradually but informally altered the criteria for recruitment into the political elite: Possessing a university degree and having ties to a prominent religious or revolutionary family have become advantageous in the competition for politically influential positions. As of 2016, Iran had an estimated three million people with more than 1 billion Tomans ($270,000), 32,000 "high net worth individuals" with a net worth of at least $3 million, 1,300 multimillionaires with net assets of $10 million or more and four billionaires.

Then-Iranian President Mahmoud Ahmadinejad says 60 percent of his country's wealth is controlled by just 300 people in Iran (out of a population of 80 million in 2016). Rich Iranians, companies, and state-backed buyers will spend up to $8.5 billion on overseas real estate over the next five-to-10 years (2016).

Middle class

After the revolution, the composition of the middle class did not change significantly, but its size doubled from about 15 percent of the population in 1979 to more than 32 percent in 2000. Several prerevolutionary social groups still were identifiable, including entrepreneurs, bazaar merchants, physicians, engineers, university teachers, managers of private and public concerns, civil servants, teachers, medium-scale landowners, junior military officers, and the middle ranks of the Shia clergy. New groups also emerged, including technicians in specialized fields such as communications, computers, electronics, and medical services; owners of small-scale factories employing fewer than 50 workers; owners of construction firms and transport companies; and professional staff of broadcast and print media. Merchants, especially those with ties to bazaar-based organizations even though their stores were physically located outside the traditional covered bazaars, gained access to political power that they had lacked before the Revolution.

The prerevolutionary cultural divide between those middle-class individuals who had a secular outlook and those who valued a role for religion in both public and private life did not disappear. Since 1979, however, the political relationship between these two contrasting views has reversed. Whereas under the monarchy the state tried to restrict religion to the private sphere, under the Islamic Republic the state consciously has promoted religion in public life. Secularly oriented Iranians have tended to resent this dominant role of the religious outlook in politics and society, especially its manifestations in numerous laws and regulations that they perceive as interfering with their personal lives. Whereas the secular-religious divide cuts across all occupational groups, in general those who promote religious values and the public observance of prayers and religious rituals tend to be more heavily concentrated in the bazaar, security forces, and managerial positions in the bureaucracies than in other lines of work and other professions.

Working class

An urban industrial working class separate from the traditional artisan class of the towns has been in the process of formation since the early twentieth century. The industrialization programs of the Pahlavi shahs provided the impetus for the expansion of this class. By the early 1970s, a distinct working-class identity, 'kargaar', had emerged, although those who applied this term to themselves did not constitute a unified group. Rather, the working class was segmented by economic sectors: the oil industry, manufacturing, construction, and transportation; also, many members of the working class were employed as mechanics. The largest component, factory workers, numbered about 2.5 million on the eve of the Revolution, double the number in 1965, accounting for 25 percent of Iran's total labor force.

Since 1979, the urban working class has continued to expand; by the early 2000s, it constituted more than 45 percent of the employed labor force. As was the situation before the Revolution, however, the workers within any one occupation did not share a common identity but rather were divided according to their perceived skills. For example, skilled construction workers, such as carpenters, electricians, and plumbers, earned significantly higher wages than the more numerous unskilled workers and tended to look down on them. Similar status differences were common among workers in the oil industry and manufacturing. An estimated 7 percent of all workers were Afghan refugees in the early 2000s. These workers were concentrated in unskilled jobs, especially in construction. Because most Afghan workers did not have work permits after 1992 and thus worked illegally, employers could pay them less than the daily minimum wage rates and not provide them with benefits required for Iranian workers.

Under both the monarchy and the republic, the government has strictly controlled union activity. After the Revolution, the Ministry of Labor established the Workers' House to sponsor Islamic unions in large manufacturing concerns. These unions discourage strikes through a combination of cooptation of workers through periodic raises and bonuses and cooperation with authorities to identify and discipline workers who exhibit tendencies toward independence. The Islamic unions generally have been effective in preventing major strikes by workers; a long history of factionalism among different working-class occupational groups and between skilled and unskilled workers within individual industries has contributed to this relative success. Nevertheless, since the early 1990s scattered strikes have defied union control. In some instances, the strikes have been resolved peacefully through negotiations, while in other cases they have been repressed violently by security forces.

Lower class

The working class is part of the overall urban lower class, or mostazafin, a social stratum that includes all families whose household incomes place them marginally above, at, or below the officially defined poverty line. In cities with populations greater than 250,000, the lower class makes up an average of 40 to 50 percent of the total population; the lower-class proportion generally is less in smaller cities (50,000 to 250,000 population) and towns. In 2010, Iran's Department of Statistics announced that 10 million Iranians live under the absolute poverty line and 30 million live under the relative poverty line. 3 million laborers have been excluded from those statistics, as their data is not registered anywhere.

The lower class can be divided into two groups: the marginally poor, who receive regular incomes on a weekly or monthly basis; and the very poor, whose incomes vary from month to month and who thus experience difficulty in paying for food, housing, and utilities. Recipients of regular incomes include pensioners, industrial and construction workers, and people employed in the diverse services sector, such as attendants in barbershops, beauty salons, and public bathhouses, bakery workers, sales clerks, domestic servants, gardeners, garbage and trash collectors, painters and plasterers (of homes), porters, street cleaners, peddlers, street vendors, office cleaners, and laundry workers. These job categories, as well as others, also include at least one million workers who are employed only occasionally or seasonally, primarily as a result of the shortage of full-time positions in an economy that has had an official unemployment rate ranging between 10 and 15 percent of the labor force since the early 1990s. Although many government agencies and private charities provide assistance to the poor, a social stigma is associated with accepting such aid, especially among adult men, whom others judge according to their ability to support a family. Among some marginally poor people in the largest cities, especially families with female heads of household, there has been an increasing tendency since the mid-1990s to rely on begging to supplement income, A few poor neighborhoods in the largest cities, such as 'Khakh-e sefid' in southeastern Tehran Province, have acquired negative reputations because gangs have established safe houses there for illegal activities such as prostitution, gambling, and drug trafficking.

Out of the 15,000 homeless persons in Iran, 10,000 are men. There are between 60,000 and 200,000 street children in Iran.

See also

 Construction in Iran
 Crime in Iran
 Demography of Iran
 Economy of Iran
 Education in Iran
 Government of Iran
 Healthcare in Iran
 Iranian Revolution
 Taxation in Iran

References